The 2014 Aspria Tennis Cup was a professional tennis tournament played on clay courts. It was the ninth edition of the tournament which was part of the 2014 ATP Challenger Tour. It took place in Milan, Italy between 16 and 22 June 2014.

Singles main-draw entrants

Seeds

 1 Rankings are as of June 9, 2014.

Other entrants
The following players received wildcards into the singles main draw:
  Roberto Marcora
  Hugo Dellien
  Yoshihito Nishioka
  Juan Lizariturry

The following players received entry from the qualifying draw:
  Federico Gaio
  Filippo Baldi
  Matteo Donati
  Gianluca Mager

The following player received entry as special exempt:
  Michael Lammer
  Gianni Mina

Doubles main-draw entrants

Seeds

1 Rankings as of June 9, 2014.

Other entrants
The following pairs received wildcards into the doubles main draw:
  Filippo Baldi /  Matteo Donati
  Eugenio Gibertini /  Vito Gioia
  Alberto Brizzi /  Riccardo Sinicropi

Champions

Singles

 Albert Ramos def.  Pere Riba, 6–3, 7–5

Doubles

 Guillermo Durán /  Máximo González def.  James Cerretani /  Frank Moser, 6–3, 6–3

External links
Official Website

Aspria Tennis Cup - Trofeo CDI
Aspria Tennis Cup